"Fight like the Night" is a song by Scottish singer-songwriter Malcolm Middleton, from his third album, A Brighter Beat. It features guest vocals by Glaswegian musician Jenny Reeve. It was his sixth single overall, and his third single from A Brighter Beat, released in the UK on 8 July 2007 on Full Time Hobby.

Overview
Middleton has commented on the song, saying:

The artwork was drawn by David Shrigley and designed by Kim McKinne.

Track listing
Songs, lyrics and music by Malcolm Middleton. Guest vocals by Jenny Reeve.
Digital download FTH039D
"Fight Like The Night" – 3:40
"A Brighter Beat (Acoustic)" – 3:26
"Fuck It, I Love You (Acoustic)" – 3:22
B-sides recorded on 27 March 2007 for The Guardian podcast.

Personnel
 Malcolm Middleton – vocals, guitar, bass guitar
 Jenny Reeve – vocals
 Barry Burns – synths and vocoder
 Scott Simpson – drums
 Tony Doogan – producer

Notes

Fight Like The Night
Malcolm Middleton songs
2007 songs
Songs written by Malcolm Middleton